William George Burns (22 October 1933 – 16 March 2009) was an Australian politician. He was a member of the Liberal Party and served in the House of Representatives from 1977 to 1980, representing the Victorian seat of Isaacs. He ran a pub in Collingwood before entering parliament.

Early life
Burns was born in Northern Ireland. He arrived in Tasmania in 1951 as a "Little Brother" with the Big Brother Movement and settled in the Derwent Valley. He eventually moved to Melbourne where he became a publican, the proprietor of the Sir Robert Peel Hotel in Collingwood.

Politics
Burns joined the Young Liberal Movement in Tasmania in 1952. There he was introduced to Senator Reg Wright who he later described as "a great friend and adviser".

Following David Hamer's transfer to the Senate, Burns won Liberal preselection for the Division of Isaacs and was elected to parliament at the 1977 federal election. In his maiden speech he raised the issues of tax breaks for zoos and government support for the disabled. One of his final speeches in the House was a condolence motion for his friend Jim Brosnan, the federal president of the Democratic Labor Party. He was defeated by the Labor candidate David Charles at the 1980 federal election.

Later life
Burns died on 16 March 2009.

References

Liberal Party of Australia members of the Parliament of Australia
Members of the Australian House of Representatives for Isaacs
Members of the Australian House of Representatives
1933 births
2009 deaths
20th-century Australian politicians
Publicans
Northern Ireland emigrants to Australia